Wheelie and the Chopper Bunch is an American animated television series, produced by Hanna-Barbera, which originally aired for one season on NBC from September 7 to November 30, 1974. The show aired for 13 half-hour episodes.

With an ensemble voice cast consisting of Frank Welker, Judy Strangis, Don Messick, Paul Winchell and Lennie Weinrib, the show follows an anthropomorphic car named Wheelie and a trouble-making motorcycle gang called the "Chopper Bunch".

The series was produced by Iwao Takamoto, executively produced by William Hanna and Joseph Barbera and directed by Charles A. Nichols. An accompanying comic book series, with contributions from artists Joe Staton and John Byrne, debuted in May 1975, although Byrne quit while finishing his second issue as he was unsatisfied with his creative control and felt he was overcompensated for his work. Other artists completed the series, which totaled seven comic books.

This series was commonly grouped together with Speed Buggy (1973) and Wonder Wheels (1977–78) due to the similarities in plot and characters. Reception-wise, several critics reacted negatively to the violence and portrayal of motorcycles in the series, prompting viewers to write letters to NBC in hopes that the show would be pulled off the air. It has since been released on DVD as part of Warner Bros.' Archive Collection on a three-disc set.

Premise
The series takes place in a world of anthropomorphic vehicles and centers on Wheelie, his girlfriend Rota Ree, and a motorcycle gang known as the Chopper Bunch. A writer for Cycle World described the premise of the show: "Wheelie, a car, is the hero, and the villains are a bunch of choppers who do everything dirty to get Wheelie, the clean, all-American car." Nearly every episode of the series focused on the Chopper Bunch attempting to outsmart Wheelie, despite their continual failed attempts. The show negatively depicted motorcycles and motorcyclists, and the Chopper Bunch typically received consequences for their actions, which sometimes involved the police.

Characters
 Wheelie (Frank Welker) is a red racing/stunt car resembling a Volkswagen Beetle. Depicted as heroic with humanlike capabilities, Wheelie often finds himself having to contend with the Chopper Bunch, a group of hoodlum motorcycles. Wheelie can only communicate in car horn 'beeps' and 'honks' that the other characters can understand, and also in words and symbols that flash on his windshield, including "Charge!" (accompanied by a bugle call and group shout) whenever he is aroused or angered. Wheelie is also equipped with mechanical hands that can produce any item he needs from his trunk.
Rota Ree (Judy Strangis) is Wheelie's devoted girlfriend who is frequently subjected to the unwanted affections of Chopper.
The Chopper Bunch:
Chopper (Frank Welker), the leader, and the show's primary antagonist. He is jealous of Wheelie and wants only to get rid of him or at least make his life miserable, and to steal Rota Ree for himself.
Revs (Paul Winchell), who always talks in spoonerisms. Winchell's performance was very similar to that of the original Scrubbing Bubbles TV commercials from 1973.
Hi-Riser (Lennie Weinrib), the tallest of the Chopper Bunch, but with the lowest IQ.
Scrambles (Don Messick), a minibike and the smallest and slowest member of the Chopper Bunch. He is also the one who constantly advises against most of the Bunch's schemes, but Chopper never listens to him until after the fact, at which point Scrambles endlessly shouts "Itoldja! Itoldja! Itoldja!".
Other Characters:
Captain Tuff (Paul Winchell), a hardened, no-nonsense police cruiser.
Deputy Fishtail (Don Messick), a police motorcycle and eager rookie obsessed with catching the Chopper Bunch, but whose attempts usually wind up ensnaring Captain Tuff instead.

Messick and Weinrib also provided voices for several other minor characters.

Production
Wheelie and the Chopper Bunch premiered in September 1974, about one year after the debut of Speed Buggy, another Hanna-Barbera cartoon with similar themes. Executively produced by William Hanna and Joseph Barbera's Hanna-Barbera Productions, Charles A. Nichols served as the series' director. Several writers contributed to the series, including Lars Bourne, Len Janson, Chuck Menville, Robert Ogle, and Dalton Sandifer. The show's official theme song was composed by Hoyt Curtin, Barbera, and Hanna. Curtin also served as the series' music composer. Iwao Takamoto, who had previously worked on several series for Hanna-Barbera productions in the past, solely produced Wheelie and the Chopper Bunch.

Like other animated series created by Hanna-Barbera in the 1970s, the show contained a laugh track created by the studio.

Broadcast history
Wheelie and the Chopper Bunch was broadcast on NBC as part of their Saturday morning children's lineup between September 7 and November 30, 1974; and before being cancelled, it continued to air regularly on the network until August 30, 1975. The series featured a total of 13 episodes with three segments each, bringing a total of 39 segments overall. During its original allocated time slot, the show rivaled The Bugs Bunny Show on ABC and repeats of Scooby-Doo, Where Are You! on CBS; it also aired immediately following reruns of the animated adaptation of The Addams Family and right before Emergency +4 on NBC.

In syndication, the series was replayed on several television networks after its cancellation. USA Network ran the series beginning May 16, 1989 and until March 28, 1991. Sister channels Cartoon Network and Boomerang have broadcast Wheelie and the Chopper Bunch on multiple occasions since their initial launch; the former began reruns in 1995, while the latter started in 2000. The episode featuring "Double Cross Country", "The Infiltrator", and "The Stunt Show" was featured on the Warner Bros. Presents DVD compilation Saturday Morning Cartoons – 1970's Volume 1 and released on May 26, 2009. As part of the Warner Bros. Television Distribution's Archive Collection, the complete Wheelie and the Chopper Bunch series was made available on DVD as a three-disc set.

Comic book series
In 1975, comic book artists Joe Staton and John Byrne were commissioned to create a series of books to coincide with broadcasts of the series. Published by Charlton Comics, it would also serve as Staton's and Byrne's first series of comic books. After the first issue (with art by Staton) was distributed in May 1975, Hanna-Barbera asked Byrne to create a mellower second issue, as the debut was considered "too scary" by executives. The second issue discouraged Byrne from continuing with the series, so he left after just two issues. Byrne also said he also felt wrong accepting the large amounts of money from Hanna-Barbera, which he stated was $50.00 per page. The series continued with other artists. A total of seven issues were made, with the final one circulating in July 1976.

Episodes

Other appearances
 Hi-Riser (voiced by Maurice LaMarche) makes a cameo in the Harvey Birdman, Attorney at Law episode "SPF".
 Wheelie, Rota Ree, and the Chopper Bunch  both appear in the HBO Max original series Jellystone!.

Reception

Critical response

Following the initial debut of the series, it received criticism and negative feedback on several aspects. Jack Anderson and Les Whitten, journalists for The Sumter Daily Item, felt that several animated television shows on NBC embodied too much violence, and listed Wheelie and the Chopper Bunch, Speed Buggy, The Pink Panther, and Bugs Bunny as the most "aggressive" ones on the channel. In their concerns, they claimed that children watching the series were more likely to be prone to negative "social behavior" around others. Ultimately, the two recommended that younger viewers watch Hanna-Barbera's Devlin due to its inclusion of "no aggression, [...] altruism, and [...] acts of sympathy explaining feelings".

A more unusual form of criticism came from the motorcyclist community. In response to the motorcycles being negatively depicted on the show, a concerned viewer named Eric L. Van Duson wrote to Cycle in 1975 expressing disgust. He claimed that the portrayals of motorcycles could perhaps "brainwash [...] little kids" into thinking that motorcyclists are "nasty". Reacting to Hanna-Barbera creating several series with vehicles serving as the main characters, such as Wheelie and the Chopper Bunch, author David Perlmutter found the use of "humanized automobiles" to be too predictable and repetitive. However, in a retrospective view of older cartoons, the staff at MeTV included the show on their list of "15 Forgotten Cartoons from the Early 1970s You Used to Love".

Legacy
Along with Speed Buggy and Wonder Wheels, Wheelie and the Chopper Bunch was one of the many Hanna-Barbera productions that incorporated automobiles able to talk and act like humans into animation; these three shows were dubbed together as a "trilogy" by Perlmutter. Additionally, it was listed as "the precursor to the numerous series featuring vehicles as super-heroes" that would arrive on television in both the 1980s and the 1990s. On the 2003 compilation album Cartoon Network: Toon-a-Rama, the official theme song for Wheelie and the Chopper Bunch was included on the track listing.

References

Citations

Bibliography

 
 
 
  2 volumes.

External links

 

1970s American animated television series
1974 American television series debuts
1975 American television series endings
American children's animated comedy television series
English-language television shows
Fictional cars
Fictional motorcycles
NBC original programming
Television series by Hanna-Barbera